The 2007 Wyre Forest District Council election took place on 3 May 2007 to elect members of Wyre Forest District Council in Worcestershire, England. One third of the council was up for election and the council stayed under no overall control.

After the election, the composition of the council was:
Conservative 18
Health Concern 10
Liberal 7
Labour 3
Liberal Democrats 2
Independent 2

Election result
The Conservatives remained the largest party on the council after winning 5 seats, but failing to gain a majority. They gained a seat in Bewdley and Arley ward but lost one back in Mitton. Health Concern were the only party to increase their number of seats after taking a seat from Labour by 11 votes in Areley Kings. The defeated Labour councillor was their leader on the council, Jamie Shaw, who had been a councillor for 23 years. The Liberals held both the seats they were defending, with Mike Price holding Offmore and Comberton where a long term councillor Mike Oborski had died in February.

Following the election the leader of the council, Conservative Stephen Clee, stood down after 3 years in charge of the council after the disappointing results for his party. He had been leader of his party in Wyre Forest for 6 years and was succeeded by John Campion.

Ward results

References

2007
2007 English local elections
2000s in Worcestershire